Kanak Chapa (born 11 September 1969) is a Bangladeshi singer. She received the Bangladesh National Film Award for Best Female Playback Singer three times, for her performance in the films Love Story (1995), Premer Taj Mahal (2001) and Ek Takar Bou (2008). She published her autobiography Sthobir Jajabor in 2011 and a poetry book Mukhomukhi Joddha in 2012.

Early life and career
Kanak Chapa was born as Rumana Morshed on 11 September 1969 in Dhaka in the then East Pakistan to Azizul Huque Morshed and Momena Jahan. She is the third among five siblings. She got her first music lessons from her father. During her career, she sang almost 3 thousand songs and released over 30 solo albums.
In 1978 she performed in television for the first time. As a child singer she became champion in Notun Kuri in the year 1978. She received championship award for "Jatiyo Shishu Protijogita" for three years in a row. She was under the guidance of artist Ustad Basir Ahmed for 12 years.

Education 
From a very little age, Kanak Chapa's father gave her the initial training in singing. Morshed was an amateur singer and also a painter who was a student of Zainul Abedin.  Kanak Chapa was born a conservative family. So her singing was not welcomed eventually. Her mother is Momena Jahan. Kanak Chapa completed her school from Madartek Abdul Aziz High School. Later she went to Viqarunnisa Noon School and College for her HSC.

Personal life
Kanak Chapa is married to music director and composer Mainul Islam Khan since 1984. Together they have one son and one daughter. They are Faizul Islam Khan and Faria Islam Khan respectively. Both of them are trained singers and practices music. 

Kanak Chapa competed from the Sirajganj-1 constituency in the 2018 Bangladeshi general election with the nomination from Bangladesh Nationalist Party and lost to Mohammed Nasim from Bangladesh Awami League.

Career 
She sang more than 3500 songs, did playback in about 2000 films. About 40 albums of her had been released and till now they are very popular. She had performed in more than 4000 stage shows. She had shared the stage with the likes of Subir Nandi, Andrew Kishore, Kumar Bishwajit, Monir Khan and other artists of Bangladesh.

Writing Career
Apart from singing, Kanak Chapa is an accomplished writer. She has written columns and fictions in many leading newspapers and online portals. She has published a total of 6 books: Sthobir Jajabor, Mukhomukhi Joddha  Megher Danay Chore, Boikata Ghuri: Kataghuri 1, Boikata Ghuri: Kataghuri 2. The last two are her autobiography consisting of two volumes and was published in 2020.

Works

Patriotic songs

Folk songs

Compilation songs

Miscellaneous songs

discography

Social activity

Kanak Chapa is involved with social organizations named "Potho Shishuder Chayatol", "Amra Khati Gorib" and "Matrisodon". She has been running an online school named "Amader Khelaghor School" for about eight years.

Awards

Bangladesh National Film Awards

Meril Prothom Alo Awards

Bachsas Awards

Ifad Film Club Award

11th Channel i Music Awards
 Best Modern Song - won

References

External links
 

1969 births
Living people
21st-century Bangladeshi women singers
21st-century Bangladeshi singers
Best Female Singer Bachsas Award winners
Best Female Playback Singer National Film Award (Bangladesh) winners
Best Female Singer Meril-Prothom Alo Award winners
People from Dhaka
20th-century Bangladeshi women singers
20th-century Bangladeshi singers